Bir Hospital (बीर अस्पताल) is the oldest and one of the busiest hospitals in Nepal. It is located at the center of Kathmandu city. The hospital is run by the National Academy of Medical Sciences, a government agency since 2003.

The hospital provides medical and surgical treatments. It current has a capacity of 535 beds.

It provides some post graduate medical training e.g. general surgery, internal medicine, orthopedic surgery, pathology etc.

Currently Dr. Santosh Paudel  is executive director of Hospital and planning to re-open its burn service in near future.

History 
Bir Hospital was established in 1947 B.S (1889AD) by Bir Shumsher Jang Bahadur Rana and was initially called Prithvi Bir Hospital, Prithvi being the name of the then king Prithvi Bir Bikram Shah. It had 30 beds.

An ordinance for the Constitution of a Bir Hospital Development Board was formulated in November of 1957 and was waiting the King's approval. 

There were separate medical buildings for men and women. Sometime in 1961, the buildings were reassigned and one became surgical and the other a medical ward. A 250 bed extension was postponed due to scarcity of funds in the same year.

Infrastructure Development 
Bir Hospital was expanded with a 200 bed Emergency and Trauma Center with funding from the Government of India, foundation stone was laid in June 1997.

Providers from hospital

Disaster Response
The hospital's disaster management plan was used first in 1988 following a stampede incident in the national stadium in Kathmandu.

Surgery

The surgery department is the oldest department of the country. It has different units as General surgery, Gastro and hepatobiliary surgery unit, Burn and Plastic surgery Unit, Urosurgery, Cardiothoracic, Neurosurgery.
The general surgery department performs about 3,000 elective and emergency operations each year, and similar number of minor general surgical cases. The department needs increase in trained manpower and equipment, as well as refurbishment of the wards and increase in the number of beds as well as operation days.

Burn and Plastic Surgery Unit

Burn and Plastic surgery unit has 16 beds, including 3 burn ICU beds. Every year more than 100 severely burned patients used to be admitted in this unit. The unit is currently run by two general surgeons. The WHO Nepal has sponsored a surgeon (Dr. Peeyush Dahal) to have fellowship training in plastic and reconstructive surgery. This unit is also conducting the research in burn care management.

Dental Department
Dental department opened a new Orthodontics and dentofacial orthopedics unit in 2009. MDS degrees in prosthodontics and periodontology & oral implantology have also been offered since 2009.

MRI Service
Bir Hospital has started MRI service from Chaitra 5, 2072 B.S.

Funding and challenges
The yearly budget of NPR 27 Crore (about US$2.371 million), two thirds of which is funded by the government. The hospital has been facing financial difficulties for many years now. The lack of adequate funding, non-functional equipment and inability of the administration to get those running pose significant challenges to the hospital's functioning. Moreover, inappropriate politicization of the administration seems to be the major contributor to the sorry state of affairs at the hospital.

To help in the financing of the hospital expenses, it runs a medical school, which conducts post-graduate medical, surgical and other specialists training and also runs bachelor's level in nursing.

See also

List of hospitals in Nepal
Journal of Nepal Medical Association

References

Hospitals in Nepal
Hospitals established in 1889
Buildings and structures in Kathmandu
1889 establishments in Nepal